Federal Communications Commission v. Prometheus Radio Project, 592 U.S. ___ (2021), was a United States Supreme Court case dealing with media ownership rules that the Federal Communications Commission (FCC) can set under the Telecommunications Act of 1996. The case dates back to Third Circuit rulings from 2002 that have blocked FCC decisions to relax media ownership rules related to cross-ownership of newspapers with television and radio broadcast stations. In the present case, the Supreme Court ruled unanimously in April 2021 that the FCC had not made arbitrary and capricious rulemaking decisions in the context of the Administrative Procedure Act, nor had the requirement to review minority ownership of stations under Congressional mandate as stated in the Third Circuit's ruling, reversing this last ruling and allowing the FCC to proceed to relax cross-media ownership rules.

Background

In the United States, the Federal Communications Commission (FCC) had been given authority under the Communications Act of 1934 to set media ownership rules of broadcast services such as radio and television that served the same community as to manage the broadcasting spectrum. In 1975, the FCC enacted a rule restricting cross-media ownership, preventing newspapers from also owning broadcast services, as to reduce concentration of media ownership that had been occurring in the years prior. While the FCC could not regulate newspapers, they could extend their regulation on broadcast services to cover cross-ownership.

The 1975 rule led to a number of debates on the cross-media ownership rules, as they were found to become barriers to entry into the market. Among other functions, the Telecommunications Act of 1996 instructed the FCC to perform a review of its rules related to media ownership every four years and repeal rules that no longer made sense in the current market as to foster competition within the communications industry.

The first such review was performed in 2002. The FCC issued its first proposed rule that year for public review, and voted in 2003 to enact it. The new rule partially repealed the cross-media ownership limitations as the FCC found that the rule was no longer necessary in the public interest to maintain competition, diversity or localism. However, it maintained some limited ownership controls through a diversity index based on the Herfindahl–Hirschman Index to determine if market consolidation was an issue. The ruling was challenged by several groups, with the primary legal challenge led by the Prometheus Radio Project, a non-profit advocacy group campaigning against media consolidation. The suit reached the Third Circuit Court of Appeals, which ruled in Prometheus Radio Project v. FCC (or Prometheus I) that while the FCC had properly justified replacing the older cross-ownership restrictions with the newer cross-media limits, the reasoning they used to justified the rules for the new limits was insufficient, specifically for how the diversity index was calculated with the inclusion of Internet coverage. The Third Circuit placed a stay on the new cross-media limit rules, and required the FCC to maintain the pre-2002 rules for cross-ownership.

The FCC's next required review under the Telecommunications Act came in 2006, which included reassessing the Third Circuit's decision alongside commissioned studies on the state and impact of changing the cross-ownership rules. It issued new rules in 2008, primarily limiting owners of newspapers to owning one television or one radio station in the top twenty urban markets. The rules also created a new class of minority-owned broadcasters which had been suggested from the Prometheus I decision as to assure there would be viewpoint diversity. The new rules were again challenged by the Prometheus Radio Project, which the Third Circuit heard in 2011 as Prometheus Radio Project v. FCC (Prometheus II). The Third Circuit ruled to maintain the stay on the new rules, stating that the FCC still had not shown good justification for the new cross-ownership rules and minority ownership concerns that the court had previously raised. The court did reassert that the FCC had compelling interest to relax the prior media ownership rules from 1975 as this served no compelling public interest, urging the FCC to find rules with proper justification to support this.

With the ongoing action in Prometheus II, the FCC failed to complete its 2010 or 2014 review, and what efforts had been performed had not followed on the cross-media ownership aspects. The lack of inaction on these matters led to a third suit, Prometheus Radio Project v. FCC (Prometheus III) in 2016 in the Third Circuit. The court ordered the FCC to complete the 2010 and 2014 reviews and issue a new proposed cross-media ownership rule by the end of 2016, since there was a compelling drive to replace the 1975 rule and the FCC's delay was hampering the process. By August 2016, the FCC issued its new rules that for all purposes left the 1975 rule in place with small modifications, such as for a failing newspaper to receive investments from a local television or radio station.

The new rules were seen as inaction by many media companies, which had been losing revenue over the previous years, and a fourth iteration or Prometheus Radio Project v. FCC (Prometheus IV) began in the courts. While the case was under litigation, newly-elected Donald Trump replaced the FCC chairmen with Ajit Pai, who led the FCC to release two new orders related to media ownership in 2017 and 2018. The 2017 orders overrode parts of the 2016 rules and essentially eliminated the cross-ownership restrictions from 1975, while the 2018 order addressed minority ownership to allow larger companies to incubate minority-owned states as to meet diversity goals. Both orders were challenged, and the cases consolidated into the ongoing Prometheus IV case at the Third Circuit. The Third Circuit ruled in September 2019 that the FCC still had not "adequately considered the effects" of the new rules on "diversity in broadcast media ownership," vacating both the 2017 and 2018 rules. The Third Circuit criticized the FCC's proposed orders for failing to consider gender or social disadvantage diversity alongside racial diversity as part of its incubator program or in relaxing the ownership rules. The decision left parts of the 2016 rules but otherwise returned media ownership back to the 1975 restrictions.

Supreme Court
While prior Third Circuit decisions have been petitioned to the Supreme Court, the Court has not certified the prior cases. The FCC petitioned to the Supreme Court to challenge the ruling from Prometheus IV in April 2020 with the support of the United States Department of Justice. The Supreme Court certified the case in October 2020, consolidated with a challenge from the National Association of Broadcasters, with oral arguments heard on January 19, 2021. Observers believed that a majority of the Justices on both conservative and liberal sides may side with the FCC as the Justices questioned whether the FCC needed to account for minority ownership under the original 1996 law, which has been a limiting factor in the Third Circuit's decisions in the past cases, and that under the Administrative Procedures Act, the FCC has shown it has done a sufficient amount of evaluation in its rule-making evaluations to all other factors relating to public interest of media ownership.

The Court issued its unanimous ruling on April 1, 2021, reversing the Third Circuit's most recent decision. The majority opinion was written by Justice Brett Kavanaugh and joined by all other Justices. Kavanaugh wrote that the Court found that the FCC's decision to modify or eliminate the prior cross-media ownership rules were not arbitrary and capricious and thus did not violate the APA. Justice Clarence Thomas also wrote a concurrence.

References

External links 
 

2021 in United States case law
Federal Communications Commission litigation
Concentration of media ownership
United States Supreme Court cases of the Roberts Court
United States administrative case law
United States Supreme Court cases